The Russian Booker Prize (Russian Booker) was a Russian literary award modeled after the Booker Prize. It was awarded from 1992 to 2017. It was inaugurated by English Chief Executive Sir Michael Harris Caine. It was awarded each year to the best work of fiction, written in the Russian language, as decided by a panel of judges, irrespective of the writer's citizenship. , the chair of the Russian Booker Prize Committee was British journalist George Walden. The prize was the first Russian non-governmental literary award since the country's 1917 Revolution.

Each year, a jury choose a short list of the six best novels up for nomination from a "long list" of nominees. Initially, the winner received £10,000, roughly 48,000 RUB or $16,000. This was increased to 600,000 rubles in 2011, roughly $20,000 (roughly £13,000), while each of the short listed finalists earned $2,000 (roughly £1,300). The criteria for inclusion included literary effort, representativeness of the contemporary literary genres and the author's reputation as a writer. Length was not a criterion, as books with between 40 and 60 pages had been nominated. From 1997 to 2001, the award was renamed the Smirnoff–Booker Literary Prize, in honour of entrepreneur and Smirnoff founder Pyotr Smirnov. From 2002 to 2005, Open Russia NGO was the general sponsor of the Booker Literary Prize in Russia, leading to its name change to the Booker–Open Russia Literary Prize during that time. Before the announcement of the 2005 winner, the Booker Foundation decided to end its partnership with Open Russia after the foundation's chairman, Mikhail Khodorkovsky, was sentenced to nine years in prison for tax evasion. In 2005, the committee signed a five-year contract with London-based BP. In 2010, the prize ran into funding problems and preparations for the 2010 prize were suspended because no new sponsor could be found. Since 2011 new sponsor is Russian Telecom Equipment Company (RTEC).

In 2011, a "novel of the decade" was chosen due to lack of sponsorship to hold the customary award. Five finalists were chosen from sixty nominees selected from the prize's past winners and finalists since 2001. Chudakov won posthumously with A Gloom Is Cast Upon the Ancient Steps, which takes place in a fictional town in Kazakhstan and describes life under Stalinist Russia. Lyudmila Ulitskaya holds the record for most nominations (five, winning once), followed by Andrei Dmitriev (four, winning once) and Alexey Slapovsky (four, no wins). No person has won the award more than once.

On 19 September 2019 Foundation Board and the Аward committee of the Russian Booker Prize officially announced the termination of the award. However, the Russian Booker Fund was not closed, "leaving the opportunity for the renewal of the award".

Winners and nominees

1990s
  *   Winners

2000s
  *   Winners

2010s
  *   Winners

Criticism 
The Russian Booker was famous for unpredictable and paradoxical decisions that did not always attract the approval of Russian literary experts.

A number of writers expressed their fundamental rejection of the "Russian Booker". Already the first decision of the jury, as a result of which the award in 1992 was not received by the generally recognized favorite — the novel "The Time Night" by Lyudmila Petrushevskaya, met with almost unanimous disapproval. Vladimir Novikov (ru) in 2000, describing the very first Booker prize winner - the novel "Lines of fate, or the chest of Milashevich" by Mark Kharitonov as boring, stated: "From the very beginning, the Booker plot did not succeed, it was failed to nominate a leader through the award, which modern prose writers would passionately want to catch up and overtake. But it is precisely in this [...] the cultural function, the cultural strategy of any literary prize" Elena Fanaylova noted in 2006: "The Russian Booker does not correspond to its English parent either from a moral or from a meaningful point of view (it can be compared with the translated version of the Booker already available in Russia). The prize focuses on literature that is not interesting either on the domestic or foreign market, or, if it is a convertible author (Ulitskaya, Aksenov), it is awarded not for 'novel of the year', but 'for merits'." Yuri Polyakov in 2008 pointed out that "people receive awards not for the quality of a literary text, not for some artistic discovery, not for the ability to reach the reader, but for loyalty to a certain party, mainly experimental-liberal direction. [...] Almost all the books that were awarded with the prize, [...] did not have any serious reader's fate, [...] [these books] received the award and were immediately completely forgotten." Dmitry Bykov in 2010 noted the Booker jury's "amazing ability to choose the worst or, in any case, the least significant of six novels".

Literary critic Konstantin Trunin, describing the 2018 crisis of the award, noted: "For all the time of its existence, the prize did not justify itself, each year choosing the winner as a writer who created work that is far from understanding by Russian people of the reality surrounding him. There was a direct propaganda of Western values, not Russian ones. Or on the contrary, to the West was shown literature that was not destined to create a close resemblance to the works created in Russia during the 19th century. And it is not surprising that year after year, the Russian Booker lost its authority among the emerging awards. Being handed twenty-six times, he faced the rejection of sponsors, as a result of which it became necessary to reconsider the meaning of existence, having found the transformation required by the reader to a truly Russian humanistic value system».

References

External links
 Russian Booker Prize, official site

Awards established in 1992
Russian literary awards
Russian-language literary awards
1992 establishments in Russia